Walla is a sound effect imitating the murmur of a crowd in the background.

Walla may also refer to:

  Walla!,  Israeli web portal
 August Walla (born 1936), Austrian art brut artist
 Chris Walla (born 1975), American musician
 Walla Brook, three streams on Dartmoor, England

See also
 Walla Walla (disambiguation)
 Wallah (disambiguation)
 Wala (disambiguation)